Harry and Molly Lewis House, also known as the Fiber Products Research Center, is a historic home located near Beaver Falls in Lewis County, New York.  It was built in 1909–1910, and is a -story, five bay, Colonial Revival style masonry dwelling with a rear ell.  It has intersecting hipped roofs and features a monumental two-story projecting portico.  Also on the property are the contributing garage (c. 1909–1910), workshop (c. 1909–1910), and water system (c. 1909–1910).  The house was converted into the Fiber Products Research Center in 1957 supporting the J.P. Lewis paper company.

It was listed on the National Register of Historic Places in 2011.

References

Houses on the National Register of Historic Places in New York (state)
Colonial Revival architecture in New York (state)
Houses completed in 1910
Buildings and structures in Lewis County, New York
National Register of Historic Places in Lewis County, New York